Suplacu de Barcău is a commune in Bihor County, Crișana, Romania with a population of 4,356. It is composed of six villages: Borumlaca (Baromlak), Dolea (Dólyapuszta), Foglaș (Fogás; Fogaš), Suplacu de Barcău, Valea Cerului (Cserpatak) and Vâlcelele (Blágarét).

History

The two oldest villages in the commune, Suplacu de Barcău and Borumlaca, were partly depopulated between 1686 and 1692, as a result of the Great Turkish War; the previous inhabitants began to return once hostilities ceased. Numerous families of Slovak colonists arrived in the late 18th century, leading to the appearance of two other villages, Vâlcelele and Valea Cerului. The final two, Dolea and Foglaș, date to 1905 and 1916, respectively.

See also
 Suplacu de Barcău Viaduct

Notes

References
 Gruia Fazecaș, Doru Marta, Gabriel Moisa, Nicolae Tivadar, Istoria comunei Suplacu de Barcău, Editura Universității din Oradea, 2011

Communes in Bihor County
Localities in Crișana